Teekyu is an anime series directed and written by Shin Itagaki, based upon a manga distributed in Earth Star Entertainment's Comic Earth Star. The anime has had nine seasons, starting in October 2012. The adaptation was announced alongside the release of the manga's first tankōbon, five months after the manga was first published. This is the fastest manga-release-to-anime-announcement time that Earth Star Entertainment has ever had.

The first three seasons are animated by MAPPA. The series' first season aired between October 7 and December 23, 2012, the second one between July 7 and September 22, 2013, and the third one between October 6 and December 22, 2013. The fourth and fifth seasons, along with spinoff Takamiya Nasuno Desu! ("I am Nasuno Takamiya"), are produced by Millepensee. The fourth season and spinoff both aired from April 6 to June 22, 2015. The fifth season of Teekyu aired from July 6, 2015 to September 21, 2015. The sixth season aired from October 5, 2015 to December 21, 2015. The anime has been renewed for a 7th season in January 2016. Season 8 of Teekyū ran from on October 5, 2016 to December 21, 2016. A 9th season has been announced and aired from July to September 2017.

All seasons aired on Tokyo MX and AT-X with the third and later seasons also airing on Sun Television and the first one streamed on Niconico. All seasons have also been simulcasted by Crunchyroll. The first season was released on Blu-ray Disc and DVD on February 22, 2013. The second and third seasons were released on Blu-ray Disc on October 25, 2013, and January 24, 2014, respectively, along with two OVA episodes each. The fourth season and the Takamiya Nasuno Desu! spinoff were released on Blu-ray Disc on August 28, 2015, with the fifth season released on Blu-Ray disc on November 27, 2015.

Theme songs

Each season makes use of one theme song.

 Season 1 - , sung by Yui Watanabe, lyrics by Roots and music by Hakkai Watanabe
 Season 2 - , sung by Kyōko Narumi, written and arranged by Yashikin
 Season 3 - , sung by Naive, lyrics by Roots, music and arranged by Harukichi Yamamoto
 Best Selection
 Opening Theme - , sung by Kyōko Narumi, written and arranged by Yashikin
 Ending Theme - , sung by Kyōko Narumi, written and arranged by Yashikin
 Season 4 - , sung by Suzuko Mimori, written and arranged by Yashikin
 Season 5 - "Qunka!", sung by Kana Hanazawa, written and arranged by Yashikin
 Takamiya Nasuno Desu! - , sung by Kyōko Narumi, written and arranged by Yashakin
 Season 6 - , sung by Earth Star Dream, written and arranged by Yashakin
 Season 7 - , sung by Yui Watanabe, Suzuko Mimori, Kyōko Narumi and Hanazawa Kana, written and arranged by Yashakin
 Usakame
 Opening Theme - , sung by Yuki Nakashima, Hikaru Koide, Izumi Nakaida and Maria Tanijiri, written by Daisuke Kan and arranged by Yūki Kishida
 Ending Theme - Promise you, sung by Earth Star Dream, lyrics by Yoshie Isogai, music by Takamitsu Ono and arranged by Chihiro Tamaki
 Season 8
 Episode 85, 86, 89, 91, 93 and 95 - , sung by Kaori Ishihara, written and arranged by Kentarō Sonoda
 Episode 87, 88, 90, 92, 94 and 96 - , sung by Yui Ogura, written and arranged by Kentarō Sonoda
 Season 9
 Opening Theme - , sung by Yui Watanabe, written by and arranged by Takuya Ōhata
 Ending Theme - , sung by Earth Star Dream, lyrics by Nagae Kuwahara, music and arranged by Cher Watanabe

Season 1
Subtitle is a setting that has been quoted from the movie that Kanae saw the day before.

Season 2

Season 3

Best Selection
From July to September 2014, the show was re-edited and rebroadcast on Tokyo MX and KBS Kyoto. The Best Selection episodes were 5 minutes long, and consisted of two Teekyu episodes placed back to back.
The Best Selection rebroadcast was 14 episodes, and rebroadcast a selection of episodes from the first three seasons of Teekyu.

Season 4

Takamiya Nasuno Desu!
The Teekyu spinoff aired on the same days as the fourth season of Teekyu. Subtitle is taken from Haruki Murakami work.

Season 5

Season 6

Season 7

Usakame
The Teekyu spinoff. Subtitle is taken from haiku.

Season 8

Season 9

References

Teekyu